Boian may refer to:

 Boian, a village in Ceanu Mare Commune, Cluj County, Romania
 Boian, a village in Bazna Commune, Sibiu County, Romania
 Boianu Mare, a commune in Bihor County, Romania
 Boian (river), a river in Bihor County, Romania
 Boiany, a village in Chernivtsi Oblast, Ukraine
 Boian, Alberta, a mostly ethnic Romanian hamlet in Canada
 Boian culture, an archaeological culture